Since 2004, Greece has an embassy in Valletta and accredited its first ambassador to Malta. Before that date the Greek embassy in Rome was accredited for Malta. Malta has an embassy in Athens and two honorary consulates in Piraeus and Thessaloniki. The two countries share membership of the European Union and of the Union for the Mediterranean.

List of bilateral visits
 Visit by the then Prime Minister of Greece Costas Simitis to Valletta (24–25 May 2001) in his capacity as President of the European Council. 
 Visit to Greece by the then President of Malta, Guido de Marco (11–13 September 2002).
 Visit by the Prime Minister of Greece Kostas Karamanlis visited Malta between 9 and 11 October 2008 and had meetings with the President of Malta, Edward Fenech Adami, Prime Minister of Malta Lawrence Gonzi and the Leader of the Opposition, Joseph Muscat.

List of bilateral treaties
 Commercial Agreement (1976)
 Agreement on Scientific and Technical Cooperation (1976)
 Cultural Agreement (1976)
 Agreement on Economic, Industrial and Technical Cooperation (1980)
 Agreement on Air Transport (1999)
 Cooperation Agreement regarding Civil Protection (2001) 
 Agreement on Police Cooperation (2001)
 Agreement on the Avoidance of double taxation (2004)

Cultural relations
Following a Greek Government donation in 1992, a Greek Park was created in Malta and inaugurated on 26 January 1997 by the then Greek Foreign Minister Theodoros Pangalos.

See also 
 Foreign relations of Greece
 Foreign relations of Malta
 Greeks in Malta

References

External links
Greek Ministry of Foreign Affairs about the relation with Malta
 Maltese Ministry of Foreign Affairs: directions of Maltese representations in Greece

 
Malta
Greece